Harry Mark Christopher Judd (born 23 December 1985) is an English musician, dancer and author. He is the drummer for the band McFly. Judd won the 2011 series of Strictly Come Dancing.

Judd published his first book, Get Fit Get Happy, in 2017.

Early life and education
Judd was born in Chelmsford, Essex in southern England, the youngest of three children. He is the son of Emma and Christopher Judd. He was educated at Old Buckenham Hall, a preparatory school in the village of Brettenham, Suffolk, at Dame Bradbury's School, a preparatory school in Saffron Walden, Essex, and at Uppingham School, a private boarding school in Uppingham, Rutland. While at Uppingham, Judd was a member of Fircroft house, and was a promising batsman but gave up cricket to pursue a career in music.

Career

Judd appeared in Busted's music video for their 2003 single "Crashed the Wedding", after which he joined McFly following auditions. Alongside his band mates in McFly, Judd has been seen on TV programmes including The Paul O'Grady Show, T4's Freshly Squeezed and BBC programme Sound.

In January 2005, McFly guest-starred in an episode of the long-running BBC One drama series Casualty.

In May 2006, McFly starred in the teen comedy film Just My Luck with Lindsay Lohan and Chris Pine, which was released in the US on 12 May 2006 and in the UK on 30 June 2006. They played themselves in the film and the soundtrack featured a variety of their songs from their first two albums. During filming, rumours sparked of a relationship between Judd and Lohan. However, Lohan's reps denied this and said that it was just a publicity stunt.

In 2007 McFly appeared in the BBC One television series Doctor Who, with a short cameo role. Judd also appeared on the BBC2 panel show Never Mind the Buzzcocks.

On 8 May 2009, McFly appeared on the Channel 4 show Hollyoaks, playing a cameo version of their song "Falling in Love" outside the SUBar.

Judd appeared in McFly's own short movie Nowhere Left to Run. He starred in the leading role alongside his band mates to promote their new album Above the Noise.

Judd appeared in his first ever solo photoshoot early in 2011 when he covered the February edition of Attitude. He also appeared on All Star Family Fortunes.

Judd also appeared on the ITV2 Show Celebrity Juice on 1 March 2012.

On 6 July 2012, Judd appeared on The Million Pound Drop Live along with Michelle, his partner he only met in person once they were on stage. They won £25,000 each.

Judd has also appeared in his second solo photo shoot in the October edition of Attitude after earning their 'Hottest Man Honours' at the 2012 Attitude Awards.

In December 2013, Judd appeared on Celebrity The Chase with Chris Bisson, Gareth Thomas (rugby) and Naga Munchetty. He earned £6,000 in his individual chase, but he, Bisson and Munchetty were caught by Mark Labbett in the final chase with 49 seconds to go.

Strictly Come Dancing

On 19 November 2010, Judd appeared on and won a special Strictly Come Dancing episode for Children in Need, where he partnered Ola Jordan and beat Rochelle Humes from The Saturdays.

On 6 September 2011 it was announced that Judd would take part in the 2011 series of Strictly Come Dancing. In the launch show of the series on 10 September, his professional dance partner was revealed as Aliona Vilani. His performances were well received by the show's judges, and his scores landed him in the top half of the leaderboard each week. On 22 October Judd received the first 10 score of the series, from judge Alesha Dixon. On 26 November he received the highest score of this series which was 46 out of 47 (including 3 tens for his first dance and the top score for the swingathon). On 17 December he and Vilani won the series final at Blackpool's Tower Ballroom.

On 23 March 2012 Judd performed again in BBC's "Strictly Come Dancing Underwater", as part of Sport Relief 2012, and was narrowly beaten by Chelsee Healey.

Judd won the 2015 Christmas Special with Joanne Clifton.

*In Week 6, actor and winner of Season 11 of the U.S. version of Dancing with the Stars Jennifer Grey filled in for Len Goodman, who was on holiday.

Personal life
Judd met his wife, former Escala violinist Brittany "Izzy" Johnston, when she appeared as part of the string section on McFly's 2005 concert tour. They married in 2012 and have three children together. Their first child, a daughter, was born after they struggled to conceive with IVF, and in 2017, their son was born after being conceived naturally. The couple's third child, a son, was born in October 2021.

Judd and his McFly bandmates support the Brain Injury Rehabilitation Trust (BIRT) through the Eyes Alight Appeal founded by his wife Izzy. His brother-in-law Rupert had sustained a serious traumatic brain injury as a result of a car accident in 1997 and Rupert's long recovery inspired Izzy to set up the appeal to raise funds to support BIRT's rehabilitation programmes.

References

External links

1985 births
English drummers
British male drummers
Living people
People from Chelmsford
McFly members
Musicians from Essex
People educated at Uppingham School
People educated at Old Buckenham Hall School
Strictly Come Dancing winners
21st-century drummers
McBusted members